This is a list of electoral division results for the Australian 2010 federal election in the state of New South Wales.

Overall

Results by division

Banks

Barton

Bennelong

Berowra

Blaxland

Bradfield

Calare

Charlton

Chifley

Cook

Cowper

Cunningham

Dobell

Eden-Monaro

Farrer

Fowler

Gilmore

Grayndler

Greenway

Hughes

Hume

Hunter

Kingsford Smith

Lindsay

Lyne 

Mark Vaile had won Lyne at the [[Results of the 2007 Australian federal election in New South Wales#Lyne#2007|2007 election]], however he resigned in 2008 and Rob Oakeshott won the seat at the [[2008 Lyne by-election#2008 by-election|resulting by-election]].

Macarthur

Mackellar

Macquarie

McMahon

Mitchell

New England

Newcastle

North Sydney

Page

Parkes

Parramatta

Paterson

Reid

Richmond

Riverina

Robertson

Shortland

Sydney

Throsby

Warringah

Watson

Wentworth

Werriwa

See also 
 2010 Australian federal election
 Results of the 2010 Australian federal election (House of Representatives)
 Post-election pendulum for the 2010 Australian federal election
 Members of the Australian House of Representatives, 2010–2013

Notes

References 

New South Wales 2010